The 2008 Wests Tigers season was their 9th in the NRL. Major signings for the 2008 season are former Dragons halfback Mathew Head, backrower Corey Payne, and back Nick Youngquest.

Season summary 
The Tigers had a successful opening to the season with a round 1 win over the St George Illawarra Dragons, 24–16 and a torrid round 2 win over the North Queensland Cowboys in Townsville, 30–10.

Benji Marshall was injured in the third minute of round 1 with a knee ligament tear, sidelining him for eight to ten weeks.

Three losses in a row and injuries to hooker, Robbie Farah, kept the Tigers in the bottom half of the ladder until a round 6 win against the South Sydney Rabbitohs at the Sydney Cricket Ground on 20 April. Mathew Head returned to the NRL in round 5 after a year in the UK and recuperating from injury. Tigers then narrowly beat Cronulla Sharks 20-18.

Robbie Farah and Benji Marshall both returned to the team in the round 10 win against the Newcastle Knights. In a match that saw twelve tries scored between the two teams, Marshall scored two tries and kicked a 40/20. Mathew Head and Scott Dureau (Knights) also kicked 40/20s.

After a four game losing streak, the Wests Tigers ended the South Sydney Rabbitohs' run of five-straight wins, beating them 36–12 in round 19.

Another run of losses towards the end of the season kept the Wests Tigers out of the top eight for the third year in a row. The three losses coincided with the suspension of Todd Payten for a dangerous throw in round 22.

In the final match of the season, the Wests Tigers farewelled captain Brett Hodgson with a win over the Gold Coast Titans at Robina.

Players leaving the club at the end of the season include Brett Hodgson, Ryan O'Hara, Ben Te'o and Stuart Flanagan. It was also club CEO Steve Noyce's last year with the club.

2008 Season Results

2008 Pre-season trials

2008 Season Ladder

Players Used 

Current first-grade squad at 22 March 2008
 (Debut: Round 1)

 (Debut: Round 5)
 (Debut: Round 1)

 (Debut: Round 15)
 (Debut: Round 15)

 (Debut: Round 2)

Gains and losses

References 

Wests Tigers seasons
Wests Tigers season